Gulasi is a surname. Notable people with the surname include:

David Gulasi, Australian social media figure 
Michal Gulasi (born 1986), Czech ice hockey player